Grevillea disjuncta is a species of flowering plant in the family Proteaceae and is endemic to the south-west of Western Australia. It is low, mounded or spreading shrub with linear to more or less needle-shaped leaves and small groups of pale orange to bright red and green or yellow flowers.

Description
The flowers are arranged in leaf axils and along the stems in spreading groups of usually up to four.

Taxonomy
Grevillea disjuncta was first formally described in 1868 by Ferdinand von Mueller in Fragmenta Phytographiae Australiae. The specific epithet (disjuncta) means "separated", referring to the small groups of flowers.

Distribution and habitat
This grevillea grows in heath, shrubland and woodland mainly in the area between Dumbleyung, Nyabing and Pingrup in the Avon Wheatbelt, Esperance Plains and Mallee biogeographic regions of south-western Western Australia.

Conservation status
Grevillea disjuncta is listed as "not threatened" by the Government of Western Australia Department of Biodiversity, Conservation and Attractions.

See also
 List of Grevillea species

References

disjuncta
Endemic flora of Western Australia
Eudicots of Western Australia
Proteales of Australia
Taxa named by Ferdinand von Mueller
Plants described in 1868